Gonystylus xylocarpus is a species of plant in the family Thymelaeaceae. It is found in Indonesia and Malaysia.

References

xylocarpus
Vulnerable plants
Taxonomy articles created by Polbot